Thames Valley Harriers (TVH) is an athletics club founded in 1887. It is based at the Linford Christie Stadium, in West London, England, which is named after member and Olympic 100 metres gold medallist Linford Christie. 

In track and field, TVH competes in the Premiership Division of the National Athletics League (NAL) as well as the Division 1 of the Southern Athletics League. The club has won all of its matches in the NAL since its inception in 2021 and is the sole winner of the Premiership trophy.

The club also competes in road running and cross country at national, regional and county level. In recognition of the club's recent success - and TVH's record of strong contribution to its local community - England Athletics voted Thames Valley Harriers the top London Club for 2015.

History
Thames Valley Harriers is one of the UK's longest-established and most successful athletics clubs. It was founded in 1887 
by seven aspiring cross-country runners who used the 'Peels' coffee house in Richmond Road, West London as a base for their training runs. Christened the East Twickenham Harriers, the club flourished and to reflect its widening horizons took the name Thames Valley Harriers on 14 November 1890.

TVH became a force both on the track and in endurance races. The 1908 Olympics at nearby White City Stadium increased the club's profile and a first Olympian was secured in 1936 when George Traynor competed in the long jump alongside Jesse Owens.

Other standout performers included Ken Norris who finished second in the 1954 world cross country championships and Ron Hopcroft who set world records for both the 50 and 100 miles. TVH was also the club where middle-distance coach Frank Horwill first developed his methods, including the creation of the British Milers Club in 1963.

TVH was a founding member of the British Athletics League in 1969 and enjoyed great success over the next two decades, winning the title three times and finishing in the top three on a total of 14 occasions, as well as achieving multiple wins in the Southern road relays and cross country championships.

This success provided the momentum for the club to build a new clubhouse at the West London Stadium by Wormwood Scrubs, which was completed in 1979. From this platform emerged TVH's greatest ever athlete – Linford Christie - who claimed a haul of international sprint medals including 1992 Olympic 100m gold in Barcelona. The West London Stadium was renamed the Linford Christie Stadium in his honour and he still serves as the Club President.

2021 saw the launch of a new National Athletics League, combining the former British Athletics League (BAL) for men and UK Women's Athletics League (UKWAL) into one competition. Thames Valley Harriers won all four of the club's matches to win the title.

Honours

National Athletics League
Premiership Trophy
 Winners2022
 Winners 2021

British Athletics League (senior men)
 First Place: 1970, 1971, 1994
 Second Place: 1972, 1973, 1975, 1995, 1997
 Third Place: 1969, 1974, 1976, 1979, 1991, 1996

UK Women's Athletic League (senior women)
 First Place: 2015, 2017, 2018, 2019
 Second Place: 2016
 Third Place: 2014
 European Club Champions Cup
 First Place: 2016

Notable athletes

Olympians

References

External links
 Official club website

Sports clubs established in 1887
Athletics clubs in London
Athletics clubs in England
1887 establishments in England